Taegak station is a railway station in Taegang-ri, Kaech'ŏn municipal city, South P'yŏngan Province, North Korea. It is the terminus of the Taegak Line of the Korean State Railway.

References

Railway stations in North Korea